Logintsevo is a rural locality (a village) in Pekshinskoye Rural Settlement, Petushinsky District, Vladimir Oblast, Russia. The population was 6 as of 2010.

Geography 
Logintsevo is located on  the Somsha River, 38 km northeast of Petushki (the district's administrative centre) by road. Ankudinovo is the nearest rural locality.

References 

Rural localities in Petushinsky District